Of Wind and Weeping is the first album by the one-man metal band Mirrorthrone.

Track listing
 "Racines Dénudées" – 11:05
 "Florilège Lunatique Occultement Révélateur et Néantisation Caduque Engendrée" – 8:07
 "The Four Names of the Living Threatening Stone" – 8:29
 "Aborted" – 3:23
 "Beyond the Mirrorthrone" – 6:53
 "The Notion of Perfect" – 5:38
 "Moi Mort..." – 5:43
 "Of Wind and Weeping" – 3:20

Credits
Vladimir Cochet - Vocals, Guitars, Bass, Synthesizer & drum programming
Marthe - Female Vocals

References

External links
Official website

2003 albums
Mirrorthrone albums